ESPC may refer to:

 Edinburgh Solicitors Property Centre
 Embroidery Software Protection Coalition
 Email Sender and Provider Coalition
 Energy Savings Performance Contract
 Ethio-Swedish Pediatric Clinic
 European Science Photo Competition